is a Japanese football player.

He has played for Albirex Niigata Singapore FC, Woodlands Wellington and Hougang United FC in the S.League, primarily as a defensive midfielder. He can also operate effectively as a deep-lying playmaker.

Shimono is known for his distribution of the ball and technical ability. In recognition of his talent, he was named in the starting lineup of The New Paper's 2012 S.League team of the year.

Club career

A school team player for his alma maters Tsukimino Secondary School and Yamato Minami High School, Shimono's ability was recognized when he was one of several young players drafted into Albirex Niigata (S)'s squad during the 2009 S.League, along with Kenji Adachihara, Ryuta Hayashi and Takasuke Goto, while he was playing for the Japan Soccer College in the Hokushin'etsu Football League. This was made possible due to Japan Soccer College's official affiliation with Albirex Niigata (S)'s parent club, Albirex Niigata, and its players are often selected to turn out for the satellite Albirex Niigata (S) squad in the S.League.

Shimono made his debut in 2009 for the White Swans under then-Albirex coach, Naoki Naruo, in a match against Geylang United on 17 February 2009 which the Eagles won with a 3–1 scoreline.

To date, Shimono has played a total of 110 matches in the S.League for Albirex Niigata (S), and an additional 20 matches in domestic cup competitions like the Singapore Cup and League Cup.

On 7 December 2012, it was announced that Shimono had completed his transfer from Albirex Niigata (S) to Woodlands Wellington.

He made his debut for Woodlands Wellington on 21 February 2013 in a 2–2 draw against Warriors F.C. and scored his first goal for Woodlands Wellington incidentally in the reverse fixture against the Warriors on 25 May 2013.

Club Career Statistics

Atsushi Shimono's Profile

All numbers encased in brackets signify substitute appearances.

Honours

Club
Singapore League Cup
 2011: Champions

References

1988 births
Living people
Association football people from Kanagawa Prefecture
Japanese footballers
Japanese expatriates in Singapore
Expatriate footballers in Singapore
Japan Soccer College players
Albirex Niigata Singapore FC players
Woodlands Wellington FC players
Association football midfielders
JPV Marikina F.C. players